The Border Roads Organisation (BRO) is a road construction executive force in India that provides support to and is now a part of the Indian Armed Forces. BRO develops and maintains road networks in India's border areas and friendly neighboring countries. This includes infrastructure operations in 19 states and three union territories (including Andaman and Nicobar Islands) and neighboring countries such as Afghanistan, Bhutan, Myanmar, Tajikistan and Sri Lanka. BRO is also tasked with maintaining this infrastructure including operations such as snow clearance.

Officers from the Border Roads Engineering Service (BRES) and personnel from the General Reserve Engineer Force (GREF) form the parent cadre of the BRO. It is also staffed by officers and troops drawn from the Indian Army's Corps of Engineers on extra regimental employment (on deputation). The Indian Army Pioneer Corps are attached to BRO task forces. BRO is also included in the Order of Battle of the Armed Forces, ensuring their support at any time. The organisations motto is Shramena Sarvam Sadhyam (everything is achievable through hardwork).

BRO is instrumental in significantly upgrading and building new India-China Border Roads (ICBRs). With regard to ICBRs Vaishali S Hiwase is the first woman officer for BRO road projects along the border with China. BRO set a Guinness World Record in November 2021 for the "highest altitude road" at Umling La. BRO has been instrumental in constructing some of the great Engineering Marvels like Atal Tunnel, Atal setu, Col Chewang Rinchen Setu to name a few.

History
The BRO was formed on 7 May 1960 to secure India's borders and develop infrastructure in remote areas of the north and north-east states of the country. In order to ensure coordination and expeditious execution of projects, the Government of India set up the Border Roads Development Board (BRDB) with the prime minister as chairman of the board and with the defence minister as deputy chairman. Today, the board exercises the financial and other powers of a Department of Government of India and is chaired by the Minister of State for Defence (Raksha Rajya Mantri, RRM). Among others, Chief(s) of Army and Air Staff, engineer-in-chief, Director General Border Roads (DGBR), FA(DS) are members of the BRDB. The secretary of the board exercises the powers of Joint Secretary to the Government of India. The executive head of the BRO is the DGBR, who holds the rank of lieutenant general. In a bid to boost border connectivity, BRO has been entirely brought under the Ministry of Defence in 2015. Earlier it received funds from the Ministry of Surface Transport under the Ministry of Road Transport and Highways.

Organisation 
The BRO consists of Border Roads Wing under the Ministry of Defense and the General Reserve Engineer Force (GREF). Officers are selected through the Indian Engineering Services (IES) Examination conducted by the Union Public Service Commission (UPSC). Few officers are also deputed from Indian Army Corps of Engineers, who are posted to GREF on ERE. The GREF includes civil engineers, mechanical engineers, administrative officers and medical officers.

The Border Roads Engineering Service (BRES) officers are governed by Central Civil Services (CCS/ CCA) Rules, 1965. They also subjected to all provisions of the Army Act, 1950 and Army Rules, 1954 except a few exceptions as given in SRO 329 and SRO 330 both 23 September 1960. GREF is an integral part of the Armed Forces within meaning of Article 33 of the Constitution of India and members of GREF are also members of the Armed Forces as declared by the Supreme Court in respect of R. Viswan vs Union of India 1983 and authorized for all benefits which are applicable to Armed Forces of India.

The organisation's operations are spread across India, Bhutan, Myanmar, Tajikistan, and Afghanistan.

The BRO includes 18 projects, which are divided into Task Forces, Road Construction Companies (RCCs), Bridge Construction Companies (BCCs), Drain Maintenance Companies (DMCs), and Platoons. The organisation also includes base workshops, store divisions, training and recruitment centers, and other staff.

An Internal Financial Advisor (IFA) supports the BRO, performing the roles of Chief Accounts Officer and Internal Auditor.  This system was introduced on 23 March 1995 to introduce efficiency and improve resource utilisation. The IFA secured ISO 9001 certification in December 1999.

The organisation employs laborers locally. No local labourer is deployed in BRO for more than 179 days at a stretch, thus keeping the nature of their employment casual.

Ranks

Director General of Border Roads 

A list of the Director General of Border Roads (DGBR):

 Maj Gen KN Dubey, PVSM
 Maj Gen RA Loomba
 Maj Gen Arjan Singh
 Maj Gen JS Bawa, AVSM
 Brig Gobinder Singh
 Maj Gen VV Bhide, AVSM
 Maj Gen JS Soin, PVSM
 Maj Gen S Ahluwalia, AVSM
 Maj Gen JM Rai, AVSM
 Maj Gen JC Sachdeva, PVSM
 Lt Gen MS Gosain, PVSM, AVSM, VSM
 Lt Gen Maharaj Singh, PVSM, AVSM
 Lt Gen Vimal Shinghal, PVSM, ADC
 Lt Gen RJ Mordecai, PVSM, AVSM
 Lt Gen AK Puri, PVSM, AVSM
 Lt Gen Prakash Suri, PVSM
 Lt Gen Ranjit Singh, SM
 Lt Gen KS Rao, AVSM
 Lt Gen AK Nanda, AVSM
 Lt Gen MC Badhani, PVSM, VSM
 Lt Gen S Ravi Shankar, VSM, PVSM
 Lt Gen AT Parnaik, SM, VSM
 Lt Gen RM Mittal, PVSM, AVSM, SM, VSM
 Lt Gen  Suresh Sharma, AVSM
 Lt Gen SK Shrivastava, AVSM
 Lt Gen Harpal Singh, PVSM, AVSM, VSM
Lt Gen Rajeev Chaudhry (incumbent)

Centres of excellence 
In June 2021, the "Centre of Excellence for Road Safety & Awareness" and "Centre of Excellence for Roads, Bridges, Air Fields and Tunnels" were set up.

Role of the BRO 

Roles of the BRO include:

During Peace

 To develop and maintain the operational road infrastructure of General Staff (GS) roads in the border areas.
 To contribute to the socio-economic development of the border states.

During War

 To develop and maintain roads to keep line of control through in original sectors and re-deployed sectors.
 To execute additional tasks as laid down by the government contributing to the war effort.

BRO is entrusted for construction of roads, bridges, tunnels, causeways, helipads and airfields. The BRO is also in charge of maintenance of its road networks. In many places landslides, avalanches and snow block the routes and have to be cleared as quickly as possible. BRO also employs more than 200,000 casual paid labours in the task.

Yearly summary of roads constructed

Projects and initiatives
The BRO undertakes projects in India and friendly countries. These projects typically include developing roads, bridges, and airfields in hostile environments shunned by private enterprises, whether due to security concerns related to hostilities, or because of environmental challenges. BRO has been active during the 1962 war, the conflicts with Pakistan in 1965 and 1971, and has also been active in anti-insurgency operations in the northeast.

The BRO operates in 18 projects namely: Arunank, Beacon, Brahmank, Chetak, Deepak, Dantak (Bhutan), Himank, Hirak, Pushpak, Sampark, Setuk (currently non-functional), Sewak, Shivalik, Swastik, Udayak, Vartak and Vijayak.

Disaster management and reconstruction 
The BRO also played a vital role in reconstruction work in the aftermath of the devastating 2004 tsunami in Tamil Nadu, the 2005 Kashmir earthquake,
and the 2010 Ladakh flash floods.

Overseas infrastructure development 
Some of these projects carry out some of the development initiatives of the Indian government in foreign territories like Tajikistan, Afghanistan, Myanmar, and Bhutan. These include the Delaram-Zaranj Highway in Afghanistan, completed and handed over to the Afghan government during 2008, and the restoration of the Farkhor and Ayni air bases in Tajikistan.

Border infrastructure development 

In response to the ever-present security threat from Pakistan and increased incursions and rapid border infrastructure from China, India too is undertaking border infrastructure development.

Border roads 

As per a July 2017 update to Lok Sabha from the Government of India, construction of 73 completed strategic roads along the Sino-India border was approved in 2005 with initial and currently revised deadlines of 2012-2013 and 2019-2020 respectively, including 43 by the Ministry of Defence and 27 by the Ministry of Home Affairs, of which only 21 roads by March 2017 and 30 roads by July 2017 have been completed and the remaining are under construction as progress was slowed down due to wildlife conservation and environmental approval, insurgency related security hurdles, delay in land acquisition by the states, inaccessible terrain, inclement weather, and other impediments.

 per km of road construction by the private companies. In two years alone, 2015–16 and 2016–17, prime minister Narendra Modi's government has allocated more than US$4.7 billion in contracts for the development of border roads, which also includes the US$256 million  India–Myanmar–Thailand Trilateral Highway from Moreh in Manipur through Tamu, Myanmar to Mae Sot in Thailand.

In July 2020, BRO was also tasked with building new roads to connect eastern Bhutan to westen Tawang area such as Lumla-Trashigang road through Sakteng Wildlife Sanctuary.

Road bridges
Dec 2017). Dec 2017). On 12 October 2020 Defense Minister Rajnath Singh inaugurated 44 new bridges.

Border tunnels 

Currently, surface access to high altitude posts on Sino-India border is closed for six months every year due to snowfall and rain, and supplies are through air lift only. Some of these 17 tunnels are already under construction, including Srinagar-Kargil-Leh NH1 in J&K (Zoji La pass tunnel), Leh-Manali Highway in J&K and Himachal Pradesh (Lungalacha La, Bara-lacha la, Tanglang La, Shingo La near Nimo and Rohtang Tunnel), 578 meter Theng Pass tunnel on NH310A between Chungthang and Tung in North Sikkim, Nechipu Pass (near Bomdila) and Sela Pass tunnels on Bogibeel Assam to Sagalee to Tawang NH13 in Arunachal Pradesh. This will reduce the travel time and operational costs, eliminate the risk of avalanche and landslide.

Decorations
Awards attained by BRO personnel between 1960 and 31 January 2020:

 23 × Kirti Chakra
 218 × Shaurya Chakra
 2 × Bar to Shaurya Chakra
 2 × Padam Shree
 16 × Param Vishisht Seva Medals
 43 × Ati Vishist Seva Medals
 110 × Vishisht Seva Medals
 25 × Sena Medals
 3 × Sarvottam Jeevan Raksha Padak
 17 × Uttam Jeevan Raksha Padak
 69 × Jeevan Raksha Padak

In 2009, eight Shaurya Chakras, all posthumous, were awarded to BRO personnel for their actions in places such as Afghanistan, Sikkim, the north-east and Jammu and Kashmir. Bulldozer operator Zalim Singh, Bar to the Shaurya Chakra, was crushed by boulders while clearing a strategic road for Indian Army tanks. Two BRO men working on BRO's Project Zaranj in Afghanistan were killed during a suicide bomb attack on Zaranj-Delaram highway. Engineer Santosh Kumar Singh and driver Jaikrit Singh Rawat, while working on the Kishtwar-Sinthan Pass, died in an ambush. Others died or were killed in places such as Meghalaya, Kailash Mansarovar, Kali River and Hapoli Sarli-Huri road.

Recognition 
In November 2021, BRO received a Guinness World Record for the "highest altitude road" following construction at Umling La.

Gallery

See also

 India-China Border Roads
 Project HIMANK
Indian Army Corps of Engineers
Trans-Arunachal Highway
Mago-Thingbu to Vijaynagar Border Road
Chota Char Dham Railway

References

External links

 

1960 establishments in Delhi
Government agencies established in 1960
Military of India
Executive branch of the government of India
Roads in India
Border Roads Organisation